Luke Scully (born 28 February 2000) is a Welsh rugby union player, currently playing for United Rugby Championship side Ospreys. His preferred position is fly-half but has also played at centre.

Club career
Scully signed his first professional contract for Cardiff Blues in February 2020, joining the side from Worcester Warriors at the end of the 2019–20 season. He made his Cardiff Blues debut in Round 10 of the 2020–21 Pro14 against .

He joined Cornish Pirates in 2021 on a loan, but was injured early in his stint and only featured four times for the side.

Scully departed Cardiff at the end of the 2021–2022 season.

He linked up with the Ospreys during the 2022–2023 preseason, featuring in a friendly against Northampton. Scully made his competitive debut off the bench against the Bulls on 26 November 2022.

Scully has played for feeder club Swansea RFC.

References

External links
itsrugby.co.uk Profile
Cardiff Rugby profile (archived)
Swansea RFC profile

2000 births
Living people
Cardiff Rugby players
Rugby union fly-halves
Rugby union centres
Rugby union players from Neath Port Talbot
Welsh rugby union players
Cornish Pirates players
Ospreys (rugby union) players
Swansea RFC players